Puerto Rico Sol FC is a Puerto Rican association football club based in Mayagüez. The club is a member of the Liga Puerto Rico, the highest level of football in the country.
The Sol women’s team is recognized as a model for the development of women's football, both in economic and in cultural terms.
Sol hosts its matches at the Mayaguez Soccer Stadium, a stadium of capacity 12,175.
The team is the defending champions, having won the Liga PR in 2019, 2021, 2022.

History
Puerto Rico Sol FC was founded in 2016 by Shek Borkowski with Jose Luis Perez Torres joining in 2017. Borkowski, a native of Poland, also previously founded FC Indiana and Chicago Red Stars.

Sol joined the Liga PR in August 2018. The club won Liga PR championship in 2021 defeating Caribbean Stars 4-2 in the final. In 2022, Sol defeated Caribbean Stars 3-1 to win its third consecutive Liga PR championship.

Year-by-year

Honors

Domestic competitions

League titles 
 Liga Puerto Rico (1): 2022 Apertura
 Liga Puerto Rico (1): 2022 Clausura
 Liga Puerto Rico (1): 2021
 Liga Puerto Rico (1): 2019

Management team

{|class="wikitable"
|-
!Position
!Staff
|-
|Manager|| Shek Borkowski
|-
|Assistant coach|| Alberto Diaz
|-
|Goalkeeping coach|| Jean Vivoni
|-
|Assistant coach|| Christian Castro
|-
|Opposition analyst & coach || Hernan Lopez
|-

Current squad

Stadium

For the 2018-19 Liga Puerto Rico season, Sol played its home matches at the 4,000-seat Fajardo Soccer Stadium in Fajardo.

In May 2019 Sol FC signed a contract with the city of Mayagüez to play its home matches at the Mayagüez Athletics Stadium. As part of the deal, Sol FC would have the right to exclusive use of the stadium through 2023. The stadium is owned by the city of Mayagüez and has a capacity of 12,175 with 5,100 of those being roofed seats. It was constructed to host the athletics and soccer games of the 2010 Central American and Caribbean Games.

References

 The club joined the nascent Liga Puerto Rico for the 2019/20 season which was eventually abandoned because of the COVID-19 pandemic.

Women's association football clubs
Football clubs in Puerto Rico